Tom or Thomas Newman may refer to:

 Tom Newman (billiards player) (1894–1943), British player of English billiards and snooker
 Tom Newman (musician) (Thomas Dennis Newman, born 1943), musician and producer
 Tom Newman (scientist) (fl. 1985), researcher in nanotechnology
 Thomas Newman (Thomas Montgomery Newman, born 1955), American composer
 Thomas Newman (MP) (fl. 1415–23), lawyer and member of the Parliament of England